is an Autobahn in Germany.

It begins in Werl and ends to the Bundesautobahn 46 near Arnsberg. The government of Germany is planning to expand it from Werl to Hamm, where it is supposed to end up in the Bundesautobahn 2. Some environmental protectors are complaining about the expansion because the fear some irrevocable damage for the nature around the road.

Exit list 

|}

External links 

445
A445